Paxillus vernalis is a basidiomycete fungus found in montane forests in northern North America. It closely resembles the poisonous Paxillus involutus, and is considered likely to also be poisonous. The fungus was described as new to science by Scottish mycologist Roy Watling in 1969.

References

External links

 Mushroom Expert on the brown roll-rim

Paxillaceae
Fungi described in 1969
Fungi of North America
Taxa named by Roy Watling